Coventry City Football Club is a association football club based in Coventry, West Midlands, England. The team currently play in the Championship, the second tier of the English football league system. The club is nicknamed the Sky Blues because of the colour of their home strip. 

Coventry City formed as Singers F.C. in 1883 following a general meeting of the Singer Factory Gentleman's club. They adopted their current name in 1898 and joined the Southern League in 1908, before being elected into the Football League in 1919. Relegated in 1925, they returned to the Second Division as champions of the Third Division South and Third Division South Cup winners in 1935–36. Relegated in 1952, they won promotion in the inaugural Fourth Division season in 1958–59. Coventry reached the First Division after winning the Third Division title in 1963–64 and the Second Division title in 1966– 67 under the management of Jimmy Hill. In the 1970–71 season, the team competed in the European Inter-Cities Fairs Cup, reaching the second round. Despite beating Bayern Munich 2–1 in the home leg, they had lost 6–1 in the first leg in Germany, and thus were eliminated.

Coventry's only period in the top division to date lasted 34 consecutive years between 1967 and 2001, and they were inaugural members of the Premier League in 1992. They won the FA Cup in 1987, the club's only major trophy, when they beat Tottenham Hotspur 3–2. They experienced further relegations in 2012 and 2017, though did manage to also win the EFL Trophy in 2017. 

Coventry returned to Wembley in 2018, beating Exeter City in the League Two play-off final. Manager Mark Robins built on this success guiding the Sky Blues to 8th in League One the next season and then led the club to promotion back to the EFL Championship as League One champions in 2020. In their first season back in the Championship, Robins guided the Sky Blues to a 16th-placed finish, 12 points clear of relegation. After occupying the play-off places for a large amount of the 2021–22 season, Coventry achieved a 12th-placed finish in its second season back in the Championship. This was the club's highest league finish in 16 years.

For 106 years, from 1899 to 2005, Coventry City played at Highfield Road. The 32,609-capacity Coventry Arena was opened in August 2005 to replace Highfield Road, but the club has struggled with the new stadium lease since moving.

History in brief

 1883 – The club is founded by employees of Singer, the cycle firm, with William Stanley one of the leading lights.
 1898 – The club's name is changed from Singers F.C. to Coventry City.
 1899 – The club move to Highfield Road following stints at Dowells Field and Stoke Road.
 1901 – The club suffer their worst ever defeat with an 11–2 loss against Worcester-based Berwick Rangers in the qualifying round of the FA Cup.
 1919 – The club are voted into the Football League, where they have remained ever since.
 1928 – In February, and with Coventry struggling near the foot of Division Three South, the club's worst ever attendance is recorded. Only 2,059 turn up for the match against Crystal Palace.
 1932 – Centre-forward Clarrie Bourton heads the Football League scoring lists with 49 goals. The following season he scored 40 goals.
 1934 – City record their biggest ever victory - a 9–0 league drubbing of Bristol City.
 1936 – Coventry City win the Third Division South championship after a nail-biting final day 2–1 victory over Torquay United and return to Division Two after eleven years in the lower division.
 1958 – Goalkeeper Alf Wood becomes the oldest player to start a game for the club, which this year was a founding member of Division Four (now Football League Two). He played against Plymouth Argyle in the FA Cup aged 43 years and 207 days.
 1959 - Coventry City finish 2nd to Win Promotion back to Division 3 at the first attempt under Manager Billy Frith. 
 1961 – Former Fulham player and PFA chairman Jimmy Hill is appointed manager following an embarrassing FA Cup defeat at home to non-league King's Lynn.
 1964 – Jimmy Hill guides Coventry to promotion from Division Three as champions after a final day 1–0 victory over Colchester United.
 1967 – Coventry City promoted as Second Division champions to the top flight for the first time in their history. This made manager Jimmy Hill, who would go on to enjoy a successful career as a TV presenter, a legend at the club. Coventry's record attendance was also set in this year – officially recorded as 51,455 (although many people who were at that game suggest the attendance was a lot higher, possibly much over 60,000), against Wolverhampton Wanderers, the team that finished a close second to Coventry at the top of the table.
 1970 – Under Noel Cantwell, Coventry finish 6th in the First Division, their highest League placing. Coventry qualify for the European Fairs Cup but lost 7–3 on aggregate in the second round to Bayern Munich, despite winning the second leg 2–1 at Highfield Road.
 1977 – Coventry City escaped relegation after a 2–2 draw with Bristol City, who also escaped relegation. The result of this game relegated Sunderland, which caused allegations of match fixing over the outcome of the match due to the result of the Sunderland game being relayed to Coventry City and Bristol City players on the stadium screen before their game had finished.
1978 – The strike partnership of Ian Wallace and Mick Ferguson helped Coventry finish in seventh position in the First Division, their second-highest ever final league placing, but fractionally missing out on a UEFA Cup place.

1981 – The club reaches the League Cup semi-final but are denied their first Wembley appearance by West Ham United, despite being 3–2 ahead after the first leg. Highfield Road becomes England's first all-seater stadium.
 1987 – Coventry win the FA Cup, beating Tottenham Hotspur in the final. It is their only major trophy to date. They were runners-up to Everton in August in the Charity Shield. Coventry also won the FA Youth Cup in this year.
 1989 – Coventry were defeated by non-league Sutton United in the FA Cup Third Round, only 19 months after lifting the trophy. However, their impressive league form meant they equalled their second-highest ever end of season placing, finishing seventh once more.
1990 – Coventry reached the League Cup semi-final for the second time, but were narrowly defeated over two legs by eventual winners Nottingham Forest.
1998 – The club reached the FA Cup quarter-final but were denied a semi-final appearance as Sheffield United (a division below them) won the replay at Bramall Lane on penalties. They also attained their highest Premier League finish of 11th position. Dion Dublin earned the top scorer award, the only one for the club and the second of two players for clubs which never made the top three in the League.
 2001 – Coventry relegated from the Premier League after 34 years in the first tier. At the time, only Liverpool, Everton and Arsenal could boast longer tenures in the top flight.
 2004 – The club's football academy, based in southeast Coventry at The Alan Higgs Centre, owned by the Alan Higgs Centre Trust, was opened in September 2004.
 2005 – Coventry relocated to the 32,609 seat Ricoh Arena after 106 years at Highfield Road. The club's last game at Highfield Road stadium results in a 6–2 win over Midlands rivals Derby County in front of a sell-out 22,777 crowd.
 2007 – Coventry narrowly avoided administration when Ray Ranson and London-based hedge fund SISU Capital Limited, took over the club with twenty minutes to spare.
 2008 – The club celebrated its 125th anniversary. It avoided relegation to League One despite having been beaten 4–1 at Charlton on the final day of the season.
 2009 – The first ever complete sell-out of the Ricoh Arena was announced for the FA Cup quarter-final match against Chelsea on 7 March 2009, which Chelsea won 2–0 in front of a crowd of 31,407.
 2012 – Coventry are relegated to League One, the third tier in English Football, for the first time in 48 years.
 2013 – The club owners, SISU, place a non-operating subsidiary of the club, which owns no financial assets and has no employee on or off the pitch, into administration. The club moved all staff out of the Ricoh Arena and the administrator accepted a bid from the Otium Entertainment Group, a company registered by three ex-Coventry directors Ken Dulieu, Onye Igwe and Leonard Brody. The club agrees to play future home matches at Sixfields Stadium, Northampton, a 70-mile round-trip from the Ricoh. Following two adjournments a creditors meeting in August rejected a Company Voluntary Arrangement put forward by the administrator.
 2014 – The club return to the Ricoh Arena and suffer a shock FA Cup First round defeat at the hands of Worcester City.
 2016 – Protests from Coventry City supporters against owners SISU reach an all-time high, with demonstrations during matches against Charlton Athletic and Sheffield United receiving widespread press attention. A petition calling for SISU to sell up and leave was set up in September 2016 and has so far been signed by nearly 20,000 individuals, including several former Coventry City players and managers. FA chairman Greg Clarke described Coventry's situation as "a very sad case", a sentiment later echoed by caretaker manager Mark Venus's description of "a sorry football club".
 2017 – Coventry reach Wembley for the first time in 30 years by defeating Wycombe Wanderers in the semi-final of the EFL Trophy. They go on to win the final against Oxford United to lift their first trophy since 1987's FA Cup victory. But that result is in obvious contrast with the club's season as a whole, with Coventry being relegated to EFL League Two, their first time in the fourth tier of English football since 1959.
2018 – The club achieve a top-six finish for the first time since 1969–70, and are promoted via the League Two play-offs to League One, their first promotion from any tier since 1967.
2019 – After failing to reach an agreement with Ricoh Arena owners Wasps RFC, the club commits to a groundsharing agreement with Birmingham City, playing their home fixtures at St Andrew's (a 38-mile round-trip from Coventry), again much to the chagrin of the supporters.
2020 – Coventry were crowned Champions of EFL League One after an Extraordinary General Meeting between all 23 League One clubs, which saw the season ended 9 games early, ruled that the final table would be calculated on a points per game (PPG) basis.
2021 – The club began life back in EFL Championship for the first time in 9 years. In March 2021, The club announced that they will return to the Coventry Building Society Arena in August 2021 on a 10-year deal after spending the 2019/20 and 2020/21 seasons playing home matches in Birmingham. On Saturday 8 May, Coventry beat Millwall 6–1 to secure a 16th-placed finish in the Championship, their best league finish in 15 years. On 7 August 2021, Coventry City played Nottingham Forest at the Coventry Building Society Arena in the club's first game back at the ground in 2 years and their first Championship game in Coventry since 2012 in front of an attendance of 20,843, City won the game 2-1 after a 96th-minute injury-time winner from Kyle McFadzean.
2022 - Douglas King took over the club, buying an 85% share.
2023 - Douglas King took sole ownership of Coventry City after buying SISU's remaining 15% share in the club.

Playing kit

Colours
Coventry's home shirts are either completely or predominately sky blue. However, in past seasons, different 'home colours' were worn. For example, in 1889, the then Singers FC wore pink and blue halved shirts (mirroring the corporate colours of Singers Motors). Furthermore, in the 1890s, black and red were the club's colours. In the early 1920s, the club wore red and green (to reflect the colours of the city crest). Sky blue was first used by Coventry in 1898 and the theme was used until 1922. Variations of blue and white were then used until the 1960s and the beginning of the 'sky blue revolution'. The colour made its return in 1962 thanks to the then manager, Jimmy Hill. To mark the 125th year of the club, Coventry wore a special brown shirt in the last home game of the 2008–09 season against Watford, having first worn a chocolate brown away kit in 1978. This kit has been cited by some as the worst in English football history, but also has an iconic status with some fans.

In 2012, in the Third round FA Cup tie versus Southampton, the team wore a commemorative blue and white striped kit, marking the 25th anniversary of the club winning the FA Cup in 1987. The strip was worn again in January 2013 for Coventry's 3rd round FA Cup fixture with Tottenham Hotspur, whom they beat in the 1987 final. In 2019, Coventry City announced a new third kit in black and white honouring the city's connection with 2 Tone Records on the 40th anniversary of the record label.

Kit maker and sponsorship
Since the 2019–20 season, the kit is made by Hummel. The home, away and third kit is sponsored by BoyleSports.

The first official kit manufacture deal came in 1974 when Umbro signed a deal with the club. Coventry also had the first kit sponsorship deal in the football league, when Jimmy Hill, then Chairman of the club, negotiated a deal with Talbot, who manufactured cars in the city.

Stadium

Grounds
Dowells Field: 1883–1887
Stoke Road: 1887–1899
Highfield Road: 1899–2005
Coventry Building Society Arena: 2005–2013, 2014–2019, 2021– (known as the Ricoh Arena 2005–2021)
Sixfields Stadium: 2013–2014 (ground-share with Northampton Town for 27 competitive matches)
St Andrew's: 2019–2021 (ground-share with Birmingham City for 46 competitive matches)
Pirelli Stadium: 2022 (ground-share with Burton Albion for 1 competitive match)

106 years at Highfield Road

Coventry City began playing at the Highfield Road stadium in 1899 within the Hillfields district of the city, although the club did not buy the freehold to the site until 1937. The ground had an interesting history. In November 1940 the main stand which backed onto terraced houses in Mowbray Street was bombed by the Luftwaffe. Heavy turnstiles from the ground and gas meters from houses in Mowbray Street were discovered in Gosford Park, some 500 metres away. Bombs also damaged the roof of the terrace at the city end of the ground and the pitch resulting in the ground being unusable for more than two years.

The record crowd at the ground was on 29 April 1967 when 51,452 watched the Second Division title decider against Wolverhampton Wanderers. This was over 6,000 more than the previous record of 44,930 set against Aston Villa in 1938. Many people who were at the Wolves game suggest the attendance was higher, possibly over 55,000. Supporters climbed onto the roofs of the stands and up the floodlights.

In 1968, the main stand and the club’s offices suffered serious damage in a fire following a reserve game. The Second Division Championship trophy was destroyed in the fire and the club decided to demolish the stand and built its replacement within four months. Ten days after the fire the club hosted Manchester United and were able to use half the stand. The game attracted the club’s second highest attendance of all time (47,111).

In 1981, Highfield Road was converted into England's first-ever all-seater stadium with a capacity of around 24,500, which many criticised as killing the atmosphere of the ground. Some seats were removed a few years later. It had been gradually upgraded since then, with the final phase of work being completed in the mid-1990s, including two fully enclosed corners, providing some much-needed modernity. On 30 April 2005, the final game played at the stadium was against Midlands rivals Derby County; Coventry won 6–2. The stadium was subsequently demolished and replaced by a housing development.

Coventry Building Society Arena

For the 2005–06 season, Coventry City moved to the new 32,609-capacity Coventry Building Society Arena (then named the Ricoh Arena) after 106 years at Highfield Road. The original plan was for a state-of-the-art, 45,000-seater multipurpose stadium with removable pitch and retractable roof. It was due to be ready for the 2001–02 season and was touted to be one of the finest and most advanced stadiums in Europe. However, the club's subsequent relegation, financial problems, financier/contractor withdrawals, and England's failure to secure the 2006 World Cup competition led to a radical redesign. The resulting stadium was built to a standard bowl design with steep stands in line with several other new stadia built during that period. It has excellent acoustics and has been used to host several major rock concerts.

Despite initiating the project and being the principal attraction there, Coventry City's financial situation means that it no longer owned the stadium and must pay rent to use it; this appeared to raise concerns over the managing of the club's finances by previous club officials, because in 2001 the club was the fourth-longest serving club in the top flight of English football. The stadium naming rights were originally sold to Jaguar Cars, which has strong links with Coventry. Jaguar pulled out of the project on 16 December 2004 and a new major sponsor was needed. A £10 million deal, which included naming rights, was signed and electronics manufacturer Ricoh became the new chief sponsor for the stadium. The project was funded largely by Coventry City Council and the (Alan Edward) Higgs Charity (of which former CCFC and ACL director the late Sir Derek Higgs was a trustee), and includes shopping facilities, a casino, exhibition halls and a concert venue.

At the beginning of the 2005–06 season, construction delays at the ground forced Coventry City to play their first three games of the season away and postpone their home games. On Saturday 20 August 2005, City hosted Queens Park Rangers in the first-ever game at the Ricoh Arena; Coventry won the game 3–0. On 28 July 2011, a statue of Jimmy Hill was installed at the main entrance to the Ricoh Arena, with Hill appearing in person to unveil it.

Sixfields

On 3 May 2013, Coventry City put a contingency plan in place to play elsewhere for the 2013–14 season. It was argued by the club that this was due to ACL (Arena Coventry Limited), which managed the stadium, being unwilling to negotiate with the club to agree to a new lease. However, that led to the local newspaper, the Coventry Telegraph, starting a petition to stop Coventry City from playing outside of Coventry. It was sent to all 72 clubs in the Football League and Football League chairman Greg Clarke. In May 2013, managing director Tim Fisher set a plan of building a new stadium within the city over the next three years, and ground-sharing whilst the new ground was being built. In June 2013, ACL made an offer that Coventry City F.C. could play at the Ricoh Arena rent free while the club was in administration.

It was believed that Coventry City might ground-share with Walsall at the Bescot Stadium or attempt to stay at the Ricoh Arena, following the appointment of new owners. That arrangement was due to continue until at least 2016. Plans for the club to play its home matches outside of the city were met with strong opposition, and led to protests by Coventry fans. Member of parliament for Coventry South, Jim Cunningham, described the move as "a disgrace".

Return to the Coventry Building Society Arena
On 21 August 2014 it was announced that an agreement had been reached allowing the club to return to the Ricoh Arena for the next two years with the option of another two years. Coventry City's first home game back at the Ricoh Arena was played against Gillingham on 5 September 2014. Steve Waggott, who led the negotiations for the club, said: "We are delighted to get this deal done and I am sure every supporter of Coventry City will be thrilled with the news." City won their first match back at the Ricoh Arena 1–0 with Frank Nouble scoring the only goal of the match in front of 27,306 supporters.

The return followed a social media campaign entitled #bringCityhome by the Coventry Telegraph and a protest march by the Sky Blue Trust supporters' group. The campaign drew praise from national media and figures within the football world. It was short-listed at the 2014 British Press Awards in the "Campaign of the Year" category.

Because the tenancy agreement with Wasps was to expire in August 2018, it was reported in November 2015 that there would be a relocation to another site within the city. However it was later confirmed that Coventry City would remain at the Ricoh Arena for another year.

In May 2016 the Coventry Telegraph broke the news that the club had drawn up plans with Coventry Rugby Club for a ground-share arrangement at a redeveloped Butts Park Arena. That was eventually denied by Rugby Club chairman Jon Sharp, who said there could be no deal with the football club while it was still owned by SISU.

St Andrew's
On 7 June 2019 it was reported that talks between SISU and Wasps had again broken down meaning that Coventry would have to play their 2019–20 home matches at Birmingham City's St Andrew's ground.

The club had the option to spend a further two seasons away from Coventry and remained at St Andrew's for the 2020–21 season. The club returned to the Coventry Building Society Arena in August 2021, ending the ground-share agreement between Coventry and Birmingham.

New Stadium at the University of Warwick and second return to Coventry
In July 2020, the club confirmed that they had commenced a partnership with the University of Warwick which would see land provided for a new stadium.

In March 2021, the club announced that they had secured a ten-year agreement to return to the Ricoh Arena from the start of the 2021–22 season. The deal, described by the club's owners as "the best the club has had in terms of commercial revenue" during their time at the stadium, would not affect the longer-term goal of constructing a new stadium. The new deal also includes a seven-year break clause should the club require it.

On 5 May 2021, it was announced that the Ricoh Arena would be renamed for the first time, when it will become the Coventry Building Society Arena. The name change will come into effect in July 2021 as a part of a 10-year naming rights deal with the building society.

On 8 August 2021, Coventry City played Nottingham Forest at the Coventry Building Society Arena in the club's first game back at the ground in 2 years and their first Championship game in Coventry since 2012. They won the match 2-1. On 16 September 2021, Coventry City owner Joy Seppala told the BBC the club remained "firmly committed" to a new stadium, planned for a site owned by the University of Warwick.

The club were forced to move at least 1 match away from Coventry again in August 2022 when their EFL Cup match against Bristol City was held at Burton Albion's Pirelli Stadium due to the pitch being deemed "unsafe".

Arena Coventry entered Administration in November 2022 and was subsequently bought by Frasers Group. Coventry City did not sign to continue the previous deal with the new owners and were issued a notice of eviction on 5 December unless they signed a new deal which only ran until May 2023. The new deal was signed on 13 December meaning the Sky Blues would remain at the CBS Arena only until at least May 2023.

Supporters

Former Players' Association
In February 2007 a Former Players' Association was launched. Set up by club historian and statistician Jim Brown, former 1980s player Kirk Stephens and a committee of volunteers, its aim was to bring former players of the club together and cherish their memories. To qualify for membership players have to have made at least one first-team competitive appearance for the club or been a manager.

Around 50 former stars of the club attended the launch including Coventry City legends George Hudson, Cyrille Regis, Charlie Timmins and Bill Glazier. The association's first newsletter was published in autumn 2007 and a website launched. The launch of 2007 was followed by subsequent Legends' Days. The 2009 event, held at the home game against Doncaster Rovers was attended by 43 former players including the first visit to Coventry for many years of Roy Barry and Dave Clements. In March 2012 the membership had increased past the 200 mark with former captain Terry Yorath inducted as the 200th member at the 2012 Legends' Day.

Legends’ Day has become an almost permanent fixture amongst Coventry supporters. Legends’ Day has been held almost every year since the Inaugural Event. The only exceptions being in 2014 when the club were exiled playing home games in Northampton and in 2020 and 2021 after fans were shut out of stadiums as a result of the COVID-19 Pandemic.

Identity 

The club’s support is collectively known as The Sky Blue Army. In Coventry and Warwickshire the use of the term ‘Going Up The City’ is a term used to say you are going to watch a Coventry City match.

The club’s support massively dropped off in the years of the SISU ownership, with the decline in average attendances falling in line with the club’s slide down the league pyramid. The exit from The Ricoh Arena in 2013 led to many supporters protesting against SISU’s ownership of the club and a section of the support enforce a ‘Not One Penny More’ policy in which its backers vowed not to give any more money to the club as long as SISU remained in charge. 

In the 2013-14 season, in which the club was exiled at Northampton Town’s Sixfields Stadium the average attendance dropped to just over 2,000. 

The Sky Blue Trust is the largest member-based supporters club and in its peak was fighting to gain a stake in the club and to get fan representation on the board of directors. As of 2022 The Sky Blue Trust are less vocal and are viewed as obsolete by many supporters.

Sky Blue anthem
The words to the club's song were written in 1962 by Team Manager Jimmy Hill and Director John Camkin; The words being set to the tune of the Eton Boating Song. It was launched at the home game with Colchester on 22 December 1962 (a match abandoned at half-time because of fog) with the words printed in the programme. It quickly became popular with supporters during the epic FA Cup run in 1963 when the then Third Division team reached the quarter-finals of the FA Cup before losing to eventual winners Manchester United:

Original Words:
Let's all sing together
Play up, Sky Blues
While we sing together
We will never lose
Proud, Posh or Cobblers
Oysters or anyone
They shan't defeat us
We'll fight till the game is won!
City! City! City!

Current Words:
Let's all sing together
Play up, Sky Blues
While we sing together
We will never lose
Tottenham or Chelsea
United or anyone
They shan't defeat us
We'll fight till the game is won!
City! City! City!

Famous Supporters 

The club has a number of famous supporters, Television Broadcaster Richard Keys was born in the City and is a lifelong supporter of the club. Fellow broadcaster Jon Gaunt is also a City fan. 

The principal of the Red Bull Formula 1 team Christian Horner was outed as a supporter of the club when he jokingly claimed in an interview with Sky F1 he was trying to convince Kevin De Bruyne to join the club. 

From the world of music, Musician Neville Staple of The Specials is also a keen supporter of the club and in 2019, appeared in a kit launch for the clubs new ‘Two Tone’ themed Third Kit. Tom Clarke, Andy Hopkins and Liam Watts who formed local rock band The Enemy are all big City supporters. 

Singer/Songwriter Tom Grennan is also a fan of the club owing to his manager and agent being a Sky Blues fan.

The actor Graeme Hawley who is best known for playing the role of John Stape in the ITV soap opera Coronation Street is a season ticket holder at the club. 

Other famous fans include professional Darts players Steve Beaton and Steve Hine, Formula 1 mogul Eddie Jordan and Westlife member Brian McFadden.

Malcolm In The Middle actor Frankie Muniz is reportedly a Coventry City fan, apparently owing to a producer he made friends with on the set of the film Agent Cody Banks 2.

Politician Geoffrey Robinson is a fan of the club and once served as Chairman.

Rivalries
Leicester City are considered Coventry City's main rival and the two clubs compete the M69 Derby. However, largely due to the clubs' differing fortunes meetings between the two have been rare in recent years; the two clubs have not played each other since 2012.

Throughout the 1980s and 1990s and to the turn of the millennium, Aston Villa were considered Coventry's main rivals as they continually competed against each other in the First Division and then the Premier League. The two clubs however have not met since Coventry's relegation from the Premier League in 2001.

In the 1960s and 1970s there was intense rivalry with Wolverhampton Wanderers which started in 1965 after Wolves were relegated from Division One and the two clubs met in Division Two. The two sides were promoted together in 1967 and there were fierce battles in both city centres when the clubs met during the period. There was also rivalries with West Bromwich Albion and Walsall but these are much less fierce than the ones with Leicester, Wolves and Villa.

A local rivalry also exists with Birmingham City, however the ground share agreement at St Andrew's between 2019 and 2021 - which effectively spared Coventry from being expelled from the EFL - has led to friendlier relations between the two clubs.

The club has an unusual long-distance rivalry with North-East side Sunderland, which stems back to the end of the 1976–77 season, when Coventry, Sunderland and Bristol City were all battling against relegation from Division One on the final day of the season. With Coventry and Bristol City facing each other at Highfield Road, the referee, on the advice of the police, delayed the kick-off of the match by five minutes as many fans were still trying to enter the ground and there was a risk of serious trouble. Sunderland, who were playing away to Everton at the same time, lost 2-0, and the result was displayed on the Highfield Road scoreboard. There were still five minutes left to play and  Coventry and Bristol City effectively stopped playing knowing that a 2–2 draw would keep both teams up and send Sunderland down. There was an inquiry but the result was allowed to stand and Sunderland were relegated. Some Sunderland fans have held a grudge and there has been some rivalry more recently as the two clubs competed for promotion from League One together in 2018–19 and 2019–20. In 2018–19 crowd trouble marred the meetings between the two at The Ricoh Arena and The Stadium of Light leading to numerous arrests among both sets of fans.

Current players

First-team squad

Out on loan

Under-21 squad

Under-18 squad

Backroom staff and club officials

Seasons, awards and honours

 Coventry City deducted 10 points by the Football League for going into administration.
 Coventry City deducted 10 points by the Football League.
 Bury were expelled from the EFL on 27 August 2019 due to financial issues at the club. The season was postponed on 13 March 2020 and later concluded prematurely due to the COVID-19 pandemic, with league positions and promotions decided on a points-per-game basis.
* Season in progress.

Club honours

Notable players

Official Hall of Fame

Notable Academy graduates

Player records

Managers

Chairmen

References

External links

Official club website

 Soccerbase – Results | Squad Stats | Transfers
Sky Sports Coventry City
Coventry City Former Players Association

 
Football clubs in England
Premier League clubs
English Football League clubs
Association football clubs established in 1883
FA Cup winners
EFL Trophy winners
EFL Championship clubs
1883 establishments in England
Southern Football League clubs
Football clubs in the West Midlands (county)
Football clubs in Birmingham, West Midlands
Sport in Coventry
Sport in Birmingham, West Midlands
Companies that have entered administration in the United Kingdom